Leptographium microsporum is a species of fungus in the family Ophiostomataceae. It is a plant pathogen.

References

Fungal plant pathogens and diseases
Fungi described in 1935
Ophiostomatales